Mark Swidan is an American who has been detained in Jiangmen, China, since 2012. The United States government considers Swidan to be wrongfully detained under the Levinson Act. Swidan is from Houston, Texas, and has worked as a designer, artist, photographer and businessman.

Arrest and detention

Arrest, trial, and sentence 
In 2012, Swidan traveled to China to buy flooring and other supplies. During his trip, he was arrested in a Dongguan, Guangzhou hotel room while speaking with his family on the phone on November 14.

The Chinese government accused Swidan of narcotics-related charges. A year later, he was tried in a Jiangmen intermediate people's court. He has not confessed any criminal wrongdoing.

The verdict in the case was delayed for years. Professor Donald C. Clarke, an expert in Chinese law, has said that a long delay can be because of an internal controversy within the judicial system, with actors questioning the case's merits. Clarke said: "In such cases, the court doesn't want to embarrass police and prosecutors by acquitting, but it is also reluctant to convict, so it just sits on the case."

After five and a half years, Swidan was sentenced to death. At the time of his sentencing, U.S. Treasury Secretary Steven Mnuchin was in China to discuss the ongoing trade war between the U.S. and China.

Dui Hua Foundation has repeatedly stated that no forensic evidence links Swidan to a drug transaction or conspiracy. Dui Hua Chairman John Kamm told Newsweek, "the only 'evidence' against him is that Swidan once visited a factory where Chinese authorities allege the meth was manufactured, and that he had been in a room rented by another person where drugs were found." Kamm added that there is "no forensic evidence—no fingerprints, no DNA, no drugs in his system. Nor has evidence been presented of his 'coordinating' role—no emails, no logs of calls, etc. I am convinced that Mr. Swidan is innocent."

Swidan's detention has been cited as an instance of hostage diplomacy.

In 2014, Swidan shared a cell with Terry Lee, an Australian-educated Chinese businessman jailed for refusing to pay a bribe. Lee became convinced of Swidan's innocence despite pleas from the warden to spy on Swidan.

Conditions 
Swidan is being held at the Jiangmen Prison. Dui Hua Foundation has called the prison a "black box". Swidan has reportedly gone on multiple hunger strikes while detained. He has repeatedly threatened suicide and attempted it multiple times.

In a July 2022 interview, Swidan's mother, Katherine Swidan, said she had not spoken to him since a five-minute phone call in 2018. As of November 2022, Chinese officials have denied U.S. consular officers visits for more than a year.

Attorney Jason Poblete has advocated for Swidan's release. He said of Swidan's detention: "This man has not slept in a dark room in almost 10 years. They have not turned the lights off. He has been kept in a very small cell. He has been forced and subjected to extreme psychological pressure and pains." Peter William Humphrey, who was wrongfully detained in China, has counseled the Swidan family.

Katherine Swidan has reported that her son's health is deteriorating. She told CBS that guards broke her son's hand five to seven times, he has dislocated his knee, and he suffers from periodontal disease. It also reported that Swidan has lost 100 pounds while confined. His mother reports that he is forced to beg for food and to produce silk flowers while exposed to toxic chemicals. Katherine Swidan told The Guardian: “Mark is in a centre that is caged with probably 25 other people. There’s a hole in the ground for a toilet. They ration toilet paper. There’s no hot water, even in the winter. He told me: ‘mama, I’ve never been so cold in my life’. I look at his little boy pictures, and I just want him to be warm.” In the summertime, temperatures at the prison can reach 110 degrees Fahrenheit with no air conditioning.

Demands for release

United States 
During the Obama administration, little was done to secure Swidan's release. There were no statements from the White House or remarks from the State Department. Administration officials told Newsweek that little could be done.

The U.S. government considers Swidan wrongfully detained. Special Presidential Envoy for Hostage Affairs Roger D. Carstens has made it a priority to secure Swidan's release. National Security Advisor Jake Sullivan has raised Swidan's wrongful detention with top Chinese diplomat Yang Jiechi as a personal priority for President Joe Biden.

U.S. Ambassador to China R. Nicholas Burns wrote to Katherine Swidan to tell her that securing her son's release is an urgent priority for the White House, the State Department and the U.S. Embassy in China, but she has said that the U.S. government is not doing enough to secure her son's release.

Senator Ted Cruz and Representative Michael Cloud will introduce a bipartisan resolution to support Swidan's release. Vicente Gonzalez has also advocated for his release.

Family 
Katherine Swidan has advocated for her son's release for years. She joined the Bring Our Families Home Campaign, which advocates to bring home wrongful detainees and hostages. Swidan's image is featured in a 15-foot mural in Washington, D.C., along with other Americans wrongfully detained abroad.

United Nations 
The United Nations Working Group on Arbitrary Detention determined that Swidan's detention is wrongful. The U.N. called for his immediate release with reparations.

Dui Hua 
The Dui Hua Foundation has advocated for Swidan's release. John Kamm, its chairman, has written to the Chinese government about Swidan's detention 40 times and received three or four responses.

Kamm told the Washington Examiner, "The situation is so bad that Chinese officials have admitted to me how embarrassed they are by what has happened." He added: "I have never seen such a violation of an individual's due process rights. It is appalling. In my opinion, he's been persecuted, he’s been set up.”

Responses 
In 2022, the U.S. State Department issued a travel advisory for China, noting "arbitrary enforcement of local laws for purposes other than maintaining law and order, including the use of exit bans". The U.S. government signed an executive order aimed at sanctioning government and individuals who wrongfully detain Americans abroad.

References

Sources 

Living people
American people imprisoned abroad
People from Houston
Year of birth missing (living people)